Isthmoheros tuyrensis, is a species of cichlid fish found in slow-moving freshwater habitats on the Pacific slope of eastern Panama. Before it was recognized as the only member of the genus Isthmoheros, it was placed in several other genera, including Cichlasoma, Vieja and others, but it is not particularly closely related to any of these. The nearest relative of I. tuyrensis is Talamancaheros.

References

Heroini
Fish described in 1913
Endemic fauna of Panama